Hypocosmia pyrochroma is a species of snout moth in the genus Hypocosmia. It was described by E. Dukinfield Jones in 1912 and is known from Argentina and Brazil.

This species has also been released in Australia and South Africa for biological control of cat's claw creeper (Dolichandra unguis-cati (L.) L.G.Lohmann).

References

Moths described in 1912
Chrysauginae
Lepidoptera used as pest control agents